James Galli (10 May 1923 – 20 June 2005) was a French boxer. He competed in the men's heavyweight event at the 1948 Summer Olympics.

References

1923 births
2005 deaths
Heavyweight boxers
French male boxers
Olympic boxers of France
Boxers at the 1948 Summer Olympics